In Buddhism, wrathful deities or fierce deities are the fierce, wrathful or forceful (Tibetan: trowo, Sanskrit: krodha) forms (or "aspects", "manifestations") of enlightened Buddhas, Bodhisattvas or Devas (divine beings); normally the same figure has other, peaceful, aspects as well. Because of their power to destroy the obstacles to enlightenment, they are also termed krodha-vighnantaka, "Wrathful onlookers on destroying obstacles". Wrathful deities are a notable feature of the iconography of Mahayana and Vajrayana Buddhism, especially in Tibetan art. These types of deities first appeared in India during the late 6th century, with its main source being the Yaksha imagery, and became a central feature of Indian Tantric Buddhism by the late 10th or early 11th century.

Overview

In non-Tantric traditions of Mahayana Buddhism, these beings are protector deities who destroy obstacles to the Buddhas and the Dharma, act as guardians against demons and gather together sentient beings to listen to the teachings of the Buddhas. In Tantric Buddhism, they are considered to be fierce and terrifying forms of Buddhas and Bodhisattvas themselves. Enlightened beings may take on these forms in order to protect and aid confused sentient beings. They also represent the energy and power that is needed in order to transform negative mental factors into wisdom and compassion. They represent the power and compassion of enlightened activity which uses multiple skillful means (upaya) to guide sentient beings as well as the transformative element of tantra which uses negative emotions as part of the path. According to Chogyam Trungpa, "wrathful yidams work more directly and forcefully with passion, aggression, and delusion—conquering and trampling them on the spot."

In Tantric Buddhist art, fierce deities are presented as terrifying, demonic looking beings adorned with bone ornaments (Skt: aṣṭhimudrā) such as human skulls and other ornaments associated with the charnel ground, as well as being often depicted with sexually suggestive attributes. According to Rob Linrothe, the sensual and fierce imagery represents "poison as its own antidote, harnessed obstacles as the liberating force" and notes that they are "metaphors for the internal yogic processes to gain enlightenment".

They often carry ritual implements, or some of the ashtamangala, or "Eight Auspicious Symbols", and are depicted trampling on the (much smaller) bodies of figures, who usually personify the "obstacles" that the deity defeats.

Tantric deities

Yidams

In Indo-Tibetan Vajrayana, Yidams are divine forms of Buddhas and Bodhisattvas. The tantric practitioner is initiated into the mandala of a particular meditational deity (Sanskrit: Iṣṭa-devatā) and practices complex sadhanas (meditations) on the deity for the purpose of personal transformation. This Deity Yoga practice is central to tantric forms of Buddhism such as Tibetan Buddhism and the Generation stage of the practice is dependent on visualisation based on the vivid iconography associated with their yidam. Yidams can be peaceful, fierce and "semi-fierce" (having both fierce and peaceful aspects), with each category having its own particular set of associated imagery. Fierce deities can be divided into male and female categories. The Herukas (Tb. khrag 'thung, lit. "blood drinker") are enlightened masculine beings who adopt fierce forms to express their detachment from the world of ignorance, such as Yamantaka, Cakrasamvara, Mahākāla, or Vajrakilaya. Dakinis (Tb. khandroma, "sky-goer") are their feminine counterparts, sometimes depicted with a heruka and sometimes as independent deities. The most prevalent wrathful dakinis are Vajrayogini and Vajravārāhī. A common form of imagery is the yab-yum of a Buddha and consort in sexual union.

Gallery

Wisdom Kings
In East Asian Buddhism, Wisdom Kings (Sanskrit vidyarāja), are seen as divine manifestations of the Buddhas, who act as protectors, messengers, and defenders of the Buddhist Dharma. In East Asian Vajrayana and Chinese Esoteric Buddhism the Five Wisdom Kings are regarded as manifestations of the Five Tathagatas. In Chinese Buddhism, the Eight Wisdom Kings and Ten Wisdom Kings are regarded as manifestations of different bodhisattvas and buddhas.

Protectors
The Protectors (Sanskrit pāla) or Dharmapāla (Dharma protectors), are powerful beings, often Devas or Bodhisattvas who protect the Buddhist religion and community from inner and outer threats and obstacles to their practice. A Dharmapala can also be a Garuda, Nāga, Yaksha, Gandharva, or Asura.

Eight Dharmapalas

A common Tibetan grouping of Dharmapāla is 'The Eight Dharmapalas', who are understood to be the defenders of Buddhism. They are supernatural beings with the rank of bodhisattva who "are supposed to wage war without any mercy against the demons and enemies of Buddhism". The Eight Dharmapala are:

 Yama, the god of death 
 Mahakala, the Great Black One 
 Yamantaka, the conqueror of death
 Vaiśravaṇa or Kubera, the god of wealth 
 Hayagriva, the Horse-necked one
 Palden Lhamo, female protectress of Tibet
 White Brahma or Tshangs pa
 Begtse, a war god from Mongolia.

Gallery

See also 
 Buddhist deities
 Chinese mythology
 Hindu mythology
 Japanese mythology
 Korean mythology
 Vietnamese mythology
 Tibetan art

References

External links
 Wrathful Guardians of Buddhism—Aesthetics and Mythology
 Wrathful Deities
 Sacred visions : early paintings from central Tibet, fully digitized text from The Metropolitan Museum of Art libraries

 
Buddhist deities
Dharmapalas
Herukas
Lists of deities
Vajrayana
Yidams
Tibetan art